Pago Los Cerrillos is a branch of Montalvo Wilmot Wineries, a Spanish winery in Castilla–La Mancha, Spain. The Pago Los Cerrillos branch uses the Vino de Pago wine appellation, a classification for Spanish wine applied to individual vineyards or wine estates, unlike the Denominación de Origen Protegida (DOP) or Denominación de Origen Calificada (DOCa) which is applied to an entire wine region. The Pago Los Cerrillos was formed as a Vino de Pago in 2019, and geographically it lies within the extent of the La Mancha DOP appellation. The Montalvo Wilmot Wineries also produce Spanish wines under the Vino de la Tierra de Castilla (IGP) appellation.

References

External links

 Pago Los Cerrillos official website

Wine regions of Spain
Spanish wine
Appellations
Wine classification